Pont basculant de la Seyne-sur-Mer is a former bascule bridge in La Seyne-sur-Mer in France.
It was completed in 1917 and served originally as railway bridge. Today, it is permanently opened
and used as 44 metres tall observation tower.

External links 
 http://en.structurae.de/structures/data/index.cfm?ID=s0002985

Buildings and structures in Var (department)
Bridges in France
Bridges completed in 1917